The 1921 Penn State Nittany Lions football team represented the Pennsylvania State College in the 1921 college football season. Known as the "Mystery Team", they were coached by Hugo Bezdek and played their home games in New Beaver Field in State College, Pennsylvania.

The Lions were again undefeated, but tied Harvard and rival Pittsburgh on the road. The season concluded in December with a long trip to Seattle and a  win over struggling Washington.

Schedule

Players

Line

Backfield

Substitutes

References

Penn State
Penn State Nittany Lions football seasons
College football undefeated seasons
Penn State Nittany Lions football